Ernest Maurice Vandeweghe Jr. (September 12, 1928 – November 8, 2014) was an American professional basketball player. He was best known for playing for the New York Knicks of the NBA and for the athletic successes of his family. He and his wife Colleen Kay Hutchins (Miss America for 1952) were the parents of former NBA All-Star Kiki VanDeWeghe and Olympic swimmer Tauna Vandeweghe, and grandparents of tennis professional Coco Vandeweghe.

Born in Montreal, Vandeweghe moved to Long Island as a teenager and played football, basketball and baseball for Oceanside High School where he was also a member of the Omega Gamma Delta fraternity. A 6'3" guard, Vandeweghe played collegiately for the Colgate University Raiders, where he was an All-American. He was drafted by the Knicks in the 1949 BAA Draft, and played in the NBA for six seasons. 

After retiring from the NBA in 1956, Vandeweghe served as a physician for the Air Force while stationed overseas in Germany. Besides Kiki,  he had three other children who were successful athletes: daughter Tauna won a U.S. national swimming championship in the backstroke (and competed in the 1976 Summer Olympics), son Bruk medalled in beach volleyball in the 1994 Goodwill Games, and daughter Heather was captain of the U.S. national women's polo team and followed in her father's footsteps through medical school to become a physician. 

Vandeweghe served as chairman of the President's Council on Physical Fitness and Sports, and served on the Olympic Sports Commission under President Gerald Ford, where he assisted with the development of two key pieces of sports legislation – Title IX and the 1976 Amateur Athletic Act. He was also a senior vice president with Focus Partners LLC, a New York-based financial services firm, and a consultant with the United States Golf and Fitness Association. He occasionally provided commentary for several sports publications. Vandeweghe died at the age of 86 on November 8, 2014.

See also
List of Montreal athletes
List of famous Montrealers
List of Canadians in the National Basketball Association

References

External links
 Statistics @ basketball-reference.com

1928 births
2014 deaths
All-American college men's basketball players
American men's basketball players
Anglophone Quebec people
Basketball players from Montreal
Basketball players from New York (state)
Canadian expatriate basketball people in the United States
Canadian men's basketball players
Colgate Raiders men's basketball players
Columbia University Vagelos College of Physicians and Surgeons alumni
National Basketball Association players from Canada
New York Knicks draft picks
New York Knicks players
People from Oceanside, New York
Shooting guards
Small forwards
Vandeweghe family